The Aberdeen Tunnel Underground Laboratory is the only underground particle physics laboratory in Hong Kong. It is situated between the two vehicular tunnel tubes, behind Gates 2 and 5 of Aberdeen Tunnel on Hong Kong Island.

History
Commissioned by the University of Hong Kong (HKU) after an assessment of all existing tunnels in Hong Kong, the location of the Aberdeen Tunnel, then under construction in the valley between Mount Cameron and Mount Nicholson, was deemed the most suitable site for undertaking particle physics experimentation. Funded entirely by HKU, construction work on the laboratory was completed in 1980.

The laboratory was practically abandoned after HKU researchers completed their experiments, as no other experiments of a similar nature made further use of the facility. However, in 2006, HKU and the Chinese University of Hong Kong petitioned the Aberdeen Tunnel administration for permission to reuse the laboratory, in order to participate in a Daya Bay Reactor Neutrino Experiment by the Daya Bay Nuclear Power Plant. Due to the high amount of traffic through the tunnel, researchers only have access to the laboratory 3 to 4 times per week, mostly during late night and early morning hours. During these experiments, maintenance and cleaning operations within the tunnel have to be suspended, and all traffic is rerouted through one tunnel tube.

Collaborators

References

External links
Daya Bay Reactor Neutrino Experiment & Aberdeen Cosmic Ray Muon-induced Neutron Experiment
 https://web.archive.org/web/20120622211339/http://hk.news.yahoo.com/video/topstory-19458512/title-29722229.html

Particle physics facilities
Underground laboratories
Science and technology in Hong Kong
Subterranean Hong Kong
University of Hong Kong
Chinese University of Hong Kong
Laboratories in China